The 1914–15 Irish Cup was the 35th edition of the premier knock-out cup competition in Irish football. 

Linfield won the tournament for the 11th time, defeating Belfast Celtic 1–0 in the final.

Results

Quarter-finals

|}

Semi-finals

|}

Replay

|}

Final

References

External links
 Northern Ireland Cup Finals. Rec.Sport.Soccer Statistics Foundation (RSSSF)

Irish Cup seasons
1914–15 domestic association football cups
1914–15 in Irish association football